Samuel Fisher (born 10 July 1982) is a former professional Australian rules footballer who played for the St Kilda Football Club in the Australian Football League (AFL).

Early life
Between the ages of 17 and 19, Fisher was a promising junior golfer and played off a handicap of 1. He won the Riverland Tyre and Mag Boxing Day Classic four times, twice with his father Terry and twice with his brother Ben. However, Fisher gave away a possible career in golf for AFL football.

Fisher began playing Australian rules in South Australia with West Adelaide, where he was first identified by AFL scouts at the age of 21.

AFL career

Draft and Debut
The versatile defender was selected as pick number 55 in the 2003 AFL Draft. 

Fisher made his debut in Round 7 2004, after injuries to other key defenders meant he was required for the team. St Kilda was in a strong position when he made his debut, having won the pre-season Wizard Home Loans Cup, and were undefeated in first position in the Premiership. The Saints had strung together 10 consecutive wins including the pre-season tournament. St Kilda defeated Fremantle in Perth by 23 points. He didn't play again until round 15, and played 6 matches in a row through to round 20. It provided more stability to the team after a difficult run of matches, and St Kilda eventually won through to the top 4 for the Finals. Fisher did not play another match for the season after Round 20, watching on as the Saints played in the Qualifying Final, Semi Final, and Preliminary Final in the first 3 weeks of the Finals Series.

First Finals Match
In 2005, Fisher took a major step in his career and improved dramatically to hold down a regular spot in the Saints' defence, playing 21 matches. He generally played on the third-best forward of the opposition and began to provide prolific running from the half-back line. Despite some obvious difficulties during the year, the Saints qualified for the finals in 4th position. Fisher was part of the team that defeated the Minor Premiers Adelaide in the 1st Qualifying Final in Adelaide. He racked up 22 disposals in the match which secured St Kilda a home Preliminary Final, in one of the best Finals wins this century by any team. It was Fisher's first Finals match with St Kilda that set a standard he met consistently throughout his career, but was his final game for the year.  

In 2006, he played every match and had up 421 disposals for the season. His 20 disposal per game run and carry from the half-back line in his 23 matches was critical to St Kilda's run to the finals, which resulted in an ultimately unfulfilling and underwhelming 6th-place finish. He was rewarded for his efforts with a podium third-placed finish in the St Kilda best and fairest Trevor Barker Award.

Injuries to other key defenders at the start of the 2007 season saw Fisher assume the role of full-back and key defender. He performed strongly against the power forwards of the competition before injuring his hamstring in Round 4. He returned in Round 7 and was able to resume his attacking position across half-back in the second half of the year. Fisher achieved his first 30 disposal game in 2007, having over 30 disposals 4 times during the season. His intercept marking in the back-line became a feature of his game, and he racked up 8 matches where he finished with more than 10 marks, with 186 for the year at just over 9 per game. He finished off the year strongly, and was nominated in the backline in the squad of 40 players for the All-Australian Team. Fisher was ranked 8th in total marks, 17th in kicks per game and 2nd in marks per game, in a season where St Kilda did not get to compete in the Finals. He was again a podium finisher in the Best and Fairest Trevor Barker Award, finishing second. Fisher signed a two-year contract extension in September 2007 until the end of 2010.

Best & Fairest, All Australian
Fisher was required to play as a key position back-man after a season ending injury to teammate Matt Maguire early in the 2008 season. He played in St Kilda's 2008 National Australia Band Cup winning team, the club's first pre-season cup win since 2004. Fisher had a strong season, averaging 22 disposals and 8 marks a game at the end of a regular season where St Kilda made a late charge to the finals, securing a top 4 qualification with a win in the final round. Fisher was included in the All-Australian team on the half-back flank, the first time he had been awarded that honour. Fisher also won the Saints Trevor Barker Award for the best and fairest player in the 2008 season. He polled 680 votes to finish ahead of Nick Riewoldt, who polled 643 votes. He marked the ball more than 10 times in 11 of his 25 matches, playing in all 3 of St Kilda's Finals matches for the Season, where the Saints season ended in the Preliminary Final.

Consecutive Grand Finals
Fisher was again a consistent intercept marking and prolific running presence in St Kilda's club all-time best home and away season of 2009, being pivotal in the Saints defence. Playing as a key back-man, regularly at centre halfback, he was used as a primary rebound player. He averaged 23 disposals and 8 marks per game for the season, playing in 21 of the 22 matches in the 2009 home and away rounds, in which St Kilda qualified in first position for the finals series, winning the 2009 Minor Premiership McClelland Trophy. Fisher was one of the dominant players of the 2009 Finals series, beginning the finals with a game high 42 disposals and 16 marks in the impressive 1st Qualifying Final win against Collingwood. He then played a crucial role in St Kilda's triumphant but unforgivably gruelling Preliminary Final win two weeks later. Fisher collected 30 disposals and kicked a pivotal set shot goal from outside 50 in the Saints tough win over the Western Bulldogs, which was only assured beyond doubt with a late goal to Nick Riewoldt in the final minute plus of the game. The win meant St Kilda got to play in its first Grand Final since the legendary 1997 team. Fisher was targeted and closely checked in the Grand Final, finishing with 15 disposals and 12 "one-percenters".

Fisher missed the first two rounds of 2010, returning for a win that set the tone for the season against Collingwood in Round three. He was taken from the ground on a stretcher, tested under concussion protocols, then returned to finish out a match that St Kilda won by 28 points. Despite the nasty head clash and time on the bench, he finished with 28 disposals and 10 marks. Fisher played in all of the remaining 20 regular season games in 2010 after Round 2. He was again a consistent standout during the finals series, averaging 24 disposals and 8 marks in St Kilda unbeaten Finals Series run to the end of the 2010 AFL Grand Final. As of the end of the 2010 season, Fisher had played in Finals matches in 5 of the most recent 6 Finals Series, with 3 of those season resulting in a Preliminary Final, and two consecutive Grand Finals.

Second Best & Fairest Award
In 2011 Fisher was a stabilising force in defence during a difficult start to the season for St Kilda. At the end of 8 rounds, the Saints were listed as an underwhelming 15th on the AFL standings. Fisher played all 23 matches for the season, consistently averaging 21 disposals and 6.5 marks a game. Fisher was a consistent running option for St Kilda during a season where the team re-built its season admirably, winning 8 of its last 10 home and away matches (11 of its last 15), to qualify for a home Elimination Final. Fisher's consistency, work ethic and stability in defence was rewarded with a second Trevor Barker Award, voted the Best & Fairest player for St Kilda Football Club in season 2011.

2012 to 2016
Fisher's remaining seasons at St Kilda were adversely affected due to unavailability through injury. He played 61 matches in total in his last 5 seasons, his two most productive seasons being 15 matches in 2012, and 18 matches in 2015. At the conclusion of the 2016 season, Fisher announced his retirement from St Kilda football Club, having played an impressive tally of 228 games for St Kilda, after being a mature age recruit in his early 20's.

Fisher is currently ranked 18th on St Kilda Football Club's historical most games played list, amongst less than 400 players who have played 228 games or more all-time in league history back to the inaugural season in 1897.

Personal life 
In May 2022, Fisher was charged with regularly trafficking large quantities of illicit drugs across state borders. After not appearing at the Melbourne Magistrates' Court, he opted to stay in custody, with the matter adjourned until 10 August 2022. Nick Riewoldt, St Kilda's former captain, said that the AFL and its players association needed to do more to help players when their playing careers ended. He also acknowledged that Fisher was "having some issues" in his playing days. According to sports journalist Mark Robinson, Fisher's plea for help came back in 2012 at a time when a source told News Corp that the club "feared" the defender's lifestyle issues.

Statistics

|-
|- style="background-color: #EAEAEA"
! scope="row" style="text-align:center" | 2004
|style="text-align:center;"|
| 25 || 7 || 0 || 2 || 49 || 17 || 66 || 25 || 6 || 0.0 || 0.3 || 7.0 || 2.4 || 9.4 || 3.6 || 0.9
|-
|- style=background:#EAEAEA
| bgcolor=F0E68C | 2005# ||
| 25 || 21 || 2 || 0 || 189 || 103 || 292 || 91 || 19 || 0.1 || 0.0 || 9.0 || 4.9 || 13.9 || 4.3 || 0.9
|- style="background-color: #EAEAEA"
! scope="row" style="text-align:center" | 2006
|style="text-align:center;"|
| 25 || 23 || 2 || 2 || 310 || 162 || 472 || 158 || 30 || 0.1 || 0.1 || 13.5 || 7.0 || 20.5 || 6.9 || 1.3
|-
! scope="row" style="text-align:center" | 2007
|style="text-align:center;"|
| 25 || 20 || 0 || 2 || 296 || 110 || 406 || 186 || 23 || 0.0 || 0.1 || 14.8 || 5.5 || 20.3 || 9.3 || 1.2
|- style="background-color: #EAEAEA"
! scope="row" style="text-align:center" | 2008^
|style="text-align:center;"|
| 25 || 25 || 5 || 2 || 359 || 217 || 576 || 228 || 39 || 0.2 || 0.1 || 14.4 || 8.7 || 23.0 || 9.1 || 1.6
|-
! scope="row" style="text-align:center" | 2009
|style="text-align:center;"|
| 25 || 24 || 4 || 2 || 323 || 228 || 551 || 184 || 36 || 0.2 || 0.1 || 13.5 || 9.5 || 23.0 || 7.7 || 1.5
|- style="background-color: #EAEAEA"
! scope="row" style="text-align:center" | 2010
|style="text-align:center;"|
| 25 || 24 || 5 || 6 || 305 || 209 || 514 || 188 || 43 || 0.2 || 0.3 || 12.7 || 8.7 || 21.4 || 7.8 || 1.8
|-
! scope="row" style="text-align:center" | 2011
|style="text-align:center;"|
| 25 || 23 || 2 || 4 || 292 || 194 || 486 || 153 || 56 || 0.1 || 0.2 || 12.7 || 8.4 || 21.1 || 6.7 || 2.4
|- style="background-color: #EAEAEA"
! scope="row" style="text-align:center" | 2012
|style="text-align:center;"|
| 25 || 15 || 1 || 1 || 178 || 87 || 265 || 95 || 28 || 0.1 || 0.1 || 11.9 || 5.8 || 17.7 || 6.3 || 1.9
|-
! scope="row" style="text-align:center" | 2013
|style="text-align:center;"|
| 25 || 9 || 0 || 0 || 98 || 63 || 161 || 56 || 14 || 0.0 || 0.0 || 10.9 || 7.0 || 17.9 || 6.2 || 1.6
|- style="background-color: #EAEAEA"
! scope="row" style="text-align:center" | 2014
|style="text-align:center;"|
| 25 || 7 || 1 || 0 || 84 || 42 || 126 || 50 || 19 || 0.1 || 0.0 || 12.0 || 6.0 || 18.0 || 7.1 || 2.7
|-
! scope="row" style="text-align:center" | 2015
|style="text-align:center;"|
| 25 || 18 || 0 || 0 || 208 || 102 || 310 || 120 || 32 || 0.0 || 0.0 || 11.6 || 5.7 || 17.2 || 6.7 || 1.8
|- style="background-color: #EAEAEA"
! scope="row" style="text-align:center" | 2016
|style="text-align:center;"|
| 25 || 12 || 0 || 2 || 108 || 63 || 171 || 64 || 21 || 0.0 || 0.2 || 9.0 || 5.3 || 14.3 || 5.3 || 1.8
|- class="sortbottom"
! colspan=3| Career
! 228
! 22
! 23
! 2799
! 1597
! 4396
! 1598
! 366
! 0.1
! 0.1
! 12.3
! 7.0
! 19.3
! 7.0
! 1.6
|-
! colspan=3| Finals
! 12
! 3
! 1
! 209
! 94
! 303
! 107	
! 23
! 0.25
! 0.1
! 17.4
! 7.8
! 25.3
! 8.9
! 1.9
|}
209

References

External links

St Kilda Football Club players
West Adelaide Football Club players
All-Australians (AFL)
Trevor Barker Award winners
1982 births
Living people
Australian rules footballers from South Australia
Sandringham Football Club players
Australia international rules football team players